The name Ione has been used for one tropical cyclone in the Atlantic Ocean, three tropical cyclones in the Eastern Pacific Ocean, and one tropical cyclone in the Western Pacific Ocean. It was used in the Atlantic before the formal naming system was instituted, and in the Pacific on the old four-year lists. The name Ione was retired in the Atlantic after 1955; this was before the formal lists were created, so it was not replaced with any particular name.

Atlantic:
 Hurricane Ione (1955) – struck North Carolina

Eastern Pacific:
 Tropical Storm Ione (1966)
 Tropical Storm Ione 1 (1970)
 Tropical Storm Ione 2 (1970)
 Hurricane Ione (1974)

Western Pacific:
 Typhoon Ione (1948) (T4821) – made a landfall in Japan

Atlantic hurricane set index articles
Pacific hurricane set index articles
Pacific typhoon set index articles